Tătărăștii may refer to several places in Romania:

Tătărăștii de Jos, a commune in Teleorman County
Tătărăștii de Sus, a commune in Teleorman County
Tătărăștii de Criș, a village in Vața de Jos Commune, Alba County

See also 
 Tătaru (disambiguation)
 Tătărești (disambiguation)
 Tătărășeni (disambiguation)
 Tătărăști